The year 1980 in architecture involved some significant architectural events and new buildings.

Buildings and structures

Buildings

 The Hopewell Centre, Hong Kong, is completed.
 Balneological Hospital in Druskininkai, Lithuania is completed.
 The Tallinn TV Tower in Tallinn, Estonia is completed for the 1980 Summer Olympics in Moscow.
 The Vilnius TV Tower in Vilnius, Lithuania is completed on the last day of the year.
 The Telstra Tower in Canberra, Australia is completed.
 The Western City Gate in Belgrade, Serbia is completed.
 The 2 Fevrier Sofitel Hotel in Lomé, Togo is completed.
 Tower 42 in London, England, is completed.
 Ganter Bridge in Switzerland, designed by Christian Menn, is completed.

Events
 August 23 – Demolition of Wallis, Gilbert and Partners' Art Deco Firestone Tyre Factory (1928) on the 'Golden Mile' of London's Great West Road a week before its designation as a listed building.

Awards
 Aga Khan Prize – Hassan Fathy.
 Architecture Firm Award – Edward Larrabee Barnes Associates.
 Grand prix national de l'architecture – Paul Chemetov.
 Pritzker Prize – Luis Barragán.
 RAIA Gold Medal – John Andrews.
 RIBA Royal Gold Medal – James Stirling.
 Twenty-five Year Award – Lever House.

Births
 Jing Liu, Chinese-born architect

Deaths
 January 1 – Ernest Cormier, Canadian architect (born 1885)
 January 23 – Paul Williams, American architect (born 1894)
 February 14 – Victor Gruen, Austrian architect (born 1903)
 April 19 – Amyas Connell, New Zealand-born architect (born 1901)
 November 27 – F. Burrall Hoffman, American architect (born 1882)

References

 
20th-century architecture